Tandy may refer to:

Companies
 Tandy Corporation, a leather supply company which became the RadioShack Corporation in 2000
 Tandy Computers
 Tandy Color Computer, released in 1980
 Tandy 2000, a computer released in 1983
 Tandy 1000, a computer released in 1984
 InterTAN, the now-defunct subsidiary for Tandy's European and Canadian outlets
 Tandy Electronics, former Australian subsidiary

Other uses

 Tandy, a robot and recurring character in Sam & Cat
 "Tandy", a short story by Sherwood Anderson, part of Winesburg, Ohio
 Tandy Stark, a character played by Tandy Tatter in the British web series Corner Shop Show
 Tandy Warnow, American computer scientist
 Tandy (surname), list of notable people with the surname
 Tandy Hampton, a fictional character on the U.S. TV series Nashville 
 Phil Tandy Miller, fictional character on the U.S. TV series The Last Man on Earth

See also
 Tandi (disambiguation)